Carl Wilhelm "Ville" Vallgren (15 December 1855 – 13 October 1940) was a Finnish sculptor. His best-known work is the statue Havis Amanda in Helsinki.

Biography

He was born in Porvoo, and long resident in Paris, whither he went in 1878, after studying architecture in the Helsinki Polytechnic. He entered the École des Beaux-Arts, studied under Cavelier.

In 1882 he married Swedish sculptor Antoinette Råström with whom he worked together. She died in 1911. The same year he married French opera singer and painter Madeleine Imbert-Rohan, but the marriage was rocky from the start and ended only two years later. That year in 1913 he moved back to Finland where he met and married his third wife, Finnish sculptor Viivi Paarmio.

He died on 13 October 1940 in Helsinki, and he was buried in Porvoo.

Works
His mirrors, figurines, lamp stands, urns, and candelabra established his reputation as a decorative artist. Of his statues and portraits, several are in New York City in the Vanderbilt collection, notably Death and Resurrection and A Breton Girl. His works in Finland include a Mariatta, in the Imperial Castle, and a Christ in the National Museum at Helsinki. The marble group Maternity is in the Museum of Arras, and a bronze statuette, Youth, in the Berlin National Gallery.

See also
 Golden Age of Finnish Art
 Art in Finland

References

External links

1855 births
1940 deaths
People from Porvoo
20th-century Finnish sculptors
19th-century Finnish sculptors